The 1951–52 Magyar Kupa (English: Hungarian Cup) was the 22nd season of Hungary's annual knock-out cup football competition.

Final

See also
 1952 Nemzeti Bajnokság I

References

External links
 Official site 
 soccerway.com

1951–52 in Hungarian football
1951–52 domestic association football cups
1951-52